Tsearch may mean:
tsearch/tsearch2, the full-text search extension for PostgreSQL
tsearch, the C programming language function for a binary search tree
Tsearch, the memory scanner, debugger similar to Cheat Engine used for Cheating in video games